Karthika Mathew (born Lidiya Jacob), better known mononymously as Karthika, is an Indian actress, who has appeared in several Malayalam and Tamil films. She is best known for her performances in Nam Naadu and Dindigul Sarathy.

Personal life

Lidiya Jacob is born at Malayidamthuruthu to Puramadam Veetil P.K Jacob and Alice. She had her primary education from Bethelhem Girls High School, Njaralloor, Kochi. She married her longtime boyfriend Merin Mathew on 18 May 2009. The couple have a son, born in July 2013.

Filmography

References

External links 
 

Actresses from Kochi
Indian film actresses
Actresses in Tamil cinema
Living people
Actresses in Malayalam cinema
21st-century Indian actresses
Year of birth missing (living people)